Tawfik Toubi (11 May 1922 – 12 March 2011) was an Israeli Arab communist politician. He was the last surviving member of the first Knesset. Tawfik Toubi was married to Olga Touma and one of his sons, Elias Toubi, studied medicine in Leningrad. He is also the second longest-serving Knesset member of all time, over 41 years of office, all consecutive.

Biography
Toubi was born in Haifa to an Arab Orthodox family in 1922, he is the son of Elias and Alice (born Khoury).  and was educated at the Mount Zion School in Jerusalem. He joined the Palestine Communist Party in 1941 and later was one of the founders of the League for National Liberation, which originally opposed partition of Palestine but later came to accept it, after the Soviet Union indicated that it would support partition. He was elected to the Knesset in Israel's first elections in 1949 as a member of Maki. He was re-elected in 1951, 1955, 1959 and 1961. In 1965 he was involved in a breakaway from Maki to form Rakah, and was voted back into the Knesset on the new party's list later in the same year. In 1976, he was elected deputy secretary general of the new Hadash party, an alliance of Rakah and several other smaller left-wing and Israeli Arab parties. He served as Hadash's secretary-general from 1989 to 1993, and was elected to the Knesset on Hadash's list in 1977, 1981, 1984 and 1988, before resigning from the Knesset in July 1990 and being replaced by Tamar Gozansky. Toubi was also publisher and editor of Arab language Communist paper Al Ittihad. He retired from the Knesset in 1990, after a 41-year tenure, and died on 12 March 2011, at age 88.

Legacy

Toubi is remembered as one of the two MKs (the other being Meir Vilner) who exposed the Kafr Qasim massacre, and is seen by the Israeli left as a fighter against racism. He is regarded as father of the 'state of all its citizens' formula, which he brought up when the Knesset debated the Basic Law in 1985. It now appears in the Meretz platform, and is supported by the left, the post-Zionists and all the Arab MKs. He is seen less favorably by the Israeli right, although he is remembered as more of a respected adversary than a militant anti-Zionist (such as Azmi Bishara).

In 1949, Israeli poet Nathan Alterman wrote:

Who is Tawfik Tubi? A Knesset member,
a Communist, an Arab who sits
in that House by full right...
That's democracy, not always easy,
but if we don't understand this part,
we haven't gotten anything at all.

Toubi raised the issue of the right of return for Palestinian refugees on at least two occasions in the Knesset. After the 1948 Arab-Israeli War, he demanded that the inhabitants of al-Birwa be allowed to return to their homes, a request refused by David Ben-Gurion. After the 1967 war, he requested from Moshe Dayan that the inhabitants of Yalo be allowed to return to their homes, but it too was denied.
In 2012, the discourses and articles of Tawfik Toubi were published in Israel by his wife Olga and his son Elias. Tawfik Toubi is accepted, honored and rewarded by the Israeli establishment.

In 2011, Knesset Speaker Reuven Rivlin said:

Toubi was a valued and impressive parliamentarian that left his mark on the Israeli parliament. He was a member of a confronting movement but nevertheless insisted on respecting the rules of the game and knew how to apply them to himself in practice.

Distinctions

References

Bibliography

External links

 Tawfik Toubi's biography Knesset website 

 Ben-Gurion and Tewfik Toubi Finally Meet (October 28, 1966)

1922 births
2011 deaths
Arab members of the Knesset
Arab Israeli anti-racism activists
Israeli Christian socialists
Eastern Orthodox Christians from Israel
People from Haifa
Hadash politicians
Maki (political party) leaders
Maki (historical political party) politicians
Members of the 1st Knesset (1949–1951)
Members of the 2nd Knesset (1951–1955)
Members of the 3rd Knesset (1955–1959)
Members of the 4th Knesset (1959–1961)
Members of the 5th Knesset (1961–1965)
Members of the 6th Knesset (1965–1969)
Members of the 7th Knesset (1969–1974)
Members of the 8th Knesset (1974–1977)
Members of the 9th Knesset (1977–1981)
Members of the 10th Knesset (1981–1984)
Members of the 11th Knesset (1984–1988)
Members of the 12th Knesset (1988–1992)